Sarajlu (also Romanized as Sarājlū)is a village in Mulan Rural District, in the Central District of Kaleybar County, East Azerbaijan Province, Iran. At the 2006 census, its population was 216, in 35 families.

References 

Populated places in Kaleybar County